Narcissus cantabricus is a species of the genus Narcissus (Daffodils) in the family Amaryllidaceae. It is classified in Section Bulbocodium.

Distribution and habitat 
Narcissus cantabricus is native to the central and southern Iberian Peninsula and northwest Africa (Morocco and Algeria)

References

Bibliography 
 Abílio Fernandes. The Rehabilitation of Narcissus Cantabricus DC. Kew Bulletin Vol. 12, No. 3 (1957), pp. 373-385

cantabricus
Garden plants
Flora of Spain
Plants described in 1802